The siege of Nauplia took place on 12–20 July 1715, when the Ottoman Empire captured the city of Nauplia (Napoli di Romagna), the capital of the Republic of Venice's "Kingdom of the Morea" in southern Greece. Although Nauplia was strongly fortified and had been further strengthened with the construction of Palamidi fortress by the Venetians, the Ottomans managed to overcome them, largely through the treasonous assistance of the French colonel La Salle. The Ottomans exploded a mine and took Palamidi by storm on 20 July. The Venetian defenders retreated in panic, leading to the rapid fall of Acronauplia and the rest of the city. The garrison and populace were massacred or carried off as prisoners. The fall of Nauplia signalled the effective end of Venetian resistance to the Ottoman reconquest of the Morea, which was completed by 7 September.

References

Sources
 
 
 

18th century in Greece
1715 in the Ottoman Empire
1715 in the Republic of Venice
Nauplia 1715
Conflicts in 1715
History of Nafplion
Nauplia 1715
Nauplia 1715
Massacres committed by the Ottoman Empire